("It'll never be over for me") is the seventh studio album by Swedish singer-songwriter Håkan Hellström, released on 17 April 2013. The album was recorded, written and produced in collaboration with Björn Olsson, Johan Forsman and Måns Lundberg. The album peaked at number one on the Swedish Albums Chart.

Track listing

Charts

Weekly charts

Year-end charts

References

2013 albums
Håkan Hellström albums
Swedish-language albums
Universal Music Group albums